Liu Tianfu (October 1908 – 21 April 2002) was a Chinese Communist revolutionary and politician. He was a leader of the East River Column, an anti-Japanese guerrilla force in Guangdong during the Second Sino-Japanese War. From 1981 to 1983 he served as Governor of Guangdong, where he was a strong supporter of economic reform and worked to exonerate Guangdong cadres who had been unjustly punished during the "anti-localism movement" in the 1950s.

Early life and wartime career 
Liu was born in Guang'an, Sichuan, in October 1908, during the late Qing dynasty. He joined the Communist Youth League of China in 1934, and participated in anti-Japanese movement in Shanghai. In December 1935, he was arrested by the Kuomintang government for his activities.

After Japan launched a full-scale attack on Shanghai in August 1937 at the beginning of the Second Sino-Japanese War, Liu was released and enlisted in the 8th Group Army of the National Revolutionary Army to fight in the war. In May 1939, Liu transferred to Guangdong province, where he helped organize Communist guerrillas to fight the Japanese. He served as Political Commissar of the Guangdong People's Anti-Japanese Guerrillas, also known as the East River Column, commanded by Zeng Sheng.

After the surrender of Japan in 1945, the East River Column moved north to Shandong, and was reorganized as the Liangguang (Guangdong-Guangxi) Column of the Communist Party's Third Field Army. Liu served as Deputy Director of the Political Department of the Liangguang Column. In September 1949, he moved with the Liangguang Column back south to participate in the battle for Guangdong.

People's Republic of China 
After the founding of the People's Republic of China in October 1949, Liu was appointed Party Chief of Gaozhou-Leizhou prefecture, and organized logistical support for the Battle of Hainan Island. He worked in economic development of Guangdong province after 1956.

Liu served as Secretary of Guangdong Provincial Party Committee from 1960 to 1965, as well as Vice Governor of Guangdong from 1963 to 1965. After the Cultural Revolution, when Governor Xi Zhongxun was transferred to Beijing in November 1980, he appointed Liu, then 72 years old, as his successor.

As governor, Liu advocated the cause of the Guangdong cadres who had suffered during the "anti-localism movement" in the 1950s. As an outsider who had worked for four decades in the province, he proclaimed that there were no anti-outsider sentiments among native Cantonese cadres. Without explicitly naming him, he blamed Tao Zhu for the unfair treatment of the Cantonese. Partly due to intervention from Liu and Hu Yaobang, the Central Committee of the Communist Party of China set up a special committee to reinvestigate the matter. In 1994, the committee exonerated the victimized Guangdong cadres, especially their leader , who had died in prison during the Cultural Revolution.

Liu was a stalwart supporter of economic reforms and Guangdong's local interests. However, he only served as governor for two years due to his advanced age. He was replaced by Liang Lingguang in 1983, and became a member of the Central Advisory Commission. Liu and his successors Liang and Ye Xuanping were all considered reform pioneers who propelled the economic development of Guangdong in the 1980s.

Liu was a member of the 12th and 13th National Congress of the Communist Party of China. He was also a delegate to the 5th National People's Congress.

Liu died on 21 April 2002 in Guangzhou, aged 93.

References 

1908 births
2002 deaths
Governors of Guangdong
People's Republic of China politicians from Sichuan
Delegates to the 5th National People's Congress
Chinese military personnel of World War II
Politicians from Guang'an